Capitol Records Nashville is a major United States-based record label located in Nashville, Tennessee operating as part of the Universal Music Group Nashville. From 1991 to 1995, Capitol Nashville was known as Liberty Records, before returning to the Capitol Nashville name in 1995. While under the Liberty name, the label operated short-lived sister label Patriot Records from 1994 to 1995. In 1999, EMI launched Virgin Records Nashville but by 2001, Capitol absorbed the short-lived label. In 2010, the label launched sister label EMI Nashville. On March 23, 2011, Alan Jackson signed with Capitol's EMI Nashville division in conjunction with his own ACR Records label.

Capitol Nashville was also home to several successful comedy artists.

Artists on Capitol Nashville 
 Dierks Bentley
 Luke Bryan
 Mickey Guyton
 Adam Hambrick
Caylee Hammack
 Little Big Town
 Hot Country Knights
 Jon Pardi
 Darius Rucker
 Hootie & the Blowfish
 Carrie Underwood
 Keith Urban

Artists on EMI Records Nashville 
 Gary Allan
 Brothers Osborne
 Eric Church
 Alan Jackson
 Jon Langston
 Brandon Lay
 Chrissy Metz
 Kylie Morgan
 Brad Paisley

Former artists 

 Trace Adkins
 Susan Ashton
 Bryan Austin 
 The Bama Band
 Kelleigh Bannenr
 Stuart Herring(EMI Nashville
 Joe Barnhill
 Alan Jackson 
 Stephanie Bentley
 John Berry
 Suzy Bogguss
 Lisa Brokop
 Garth Brooks
 Kix Brooks
 T. Graham Brown
 Chris Cagle
 Glen Campbell
 Paulette Carlson
 Rodney Carrington
 Deana Carter
 Cee Cee Chapman 
 Jameson Clark
 Jessi Colter
 Billy "Crash" Craddock
 Kenny Dale
 Lacy J. Dalton
 Linda Davis
 Clay Davidson
 Billy Dean
 The Delevantes
 Amber Dotson
 George Ducas
 Whitney Duncan
 Emilio Navaira
 Ty England
 Skip Ewing
 Cleve Francis
 The Goldens 
 Noah Gordon 
 Ricky Lynn Gregg
 Mark Gross
 Merle Haggard
 Jennifer Hanson
 Joni Harms
 Walker Hayes
 Steven Wayne Horton
 Joey Hyde
 The Jenkins
 Charles Kelley
 Jerry Kilgore 
 Brandon Kinney
Lady A
 Chris LeDoux
 Tom Mabe 
 Barbara Mandrell
 Mason Dixon
 Delbert McClinton
 Mindy McCready
 Jennette McCurdy
 Mel McDaniel
 Scott McQuaig
 Dana McVicker
 Roy D. Mercer
 Dean Miller
 Dude Mowrey
 Anne Murray
 Willie Nelson
 Juice Newton
 Nitty Gritty Dirt Band
 Troy Olsen 
 Jamie O'Neal
 Marie Osmond 
 Allison Paige
 Palomino Road
 Eric Paslay
 Pearl River
 Pirates of the Mississippi
 Eddie Rabbitt
 The Ranch
 Eddy Raven
 Ashley Ray
 Julie Reeves 
 River Road
 Kenny Rogers
 Roy Rogers
 Linda Ronstadt
 Sawyer Brown 
 Don Schlitz
 Thom Schuyler
 Hillary Scott & the Scott Family
 Shenandoah
 Ryan Shupe & The RubberBand
 Russell Smith
 Jo-El Sonnier
 Verlon Thompson
 Cyndi Thomson
 Trader-Price
 Tanya Tucker
 Steve Wariner
 Emily West
 Dottie West
 Ron White
 Wild Rose
 Cheryl Wheeler
 Lari White
 Tim Wilson
 Jeff Wood
 Curtis Wright
 Billy Yates
 Faron Young
 Dan Seals

See also 
 Capitol Music Group
 Capitol Records
 List of Capitol Records artists
 EMI
 Virgin Records
 List of record labels

References

External links 
Official website

Capitol Records
Record labels based in Nashville, Tennessee
Record labels established in 1950
1950 establishments in Tennessee
American country music record labels